Havetoftloit is a village and a former municipality in the Schleswig-Flensburg district, near the Baltic Sea in northern Germany. Since 1 March 2013, it is part of the municipality Mittelangeln.

References

Former municipalities in Schleswig-Holstein